Interferon-related developmental regulator 1 is a protein that in humans is encoded by the IFRD1 gene. The gene is expressed mostly in neutrophils, skeletal and cardiac muscle, the brain, and the pancreas.
The rat and the mouse homolog genes of interferon-related developmental regulator 1 gene (and their proteins) are also known with the name PC4  and Tis21, respectively. 
IFRD1 is member of a gene family that comprises a second gene, IFRD2, also known as SKmc15.

Clinical significance 

IFRD1 has been identified as a modifier gene for cystic fibrosis lung disease. In humans, neutrophil effector function is dependent on the type of IRFD1 polymorphism present in the individual. Human and mouse data both indicate that IFRD1 has a sizable impact on cystic fibrosis pathogenesis by regulating neutrophil effector function.

Inducer of muscle regeneration 

IFRD1(also known as PC4 or Tis7, see above) participates to the process of skeletal muscle cell differentiation. In fact, inhibition of IFRD1 function in C2C12 myoblasts, by antisense IFRD1 cDNA transfection or microinjection of anti-IFRD1 antibodies, prevents their morphological and biochemical differentiation by inhibiting the expression of MyoD and myogenin, key master genes of muscle development. A role for IFRD1 in muscle differentiation has been observed also in vivo. Muscles from mice lacking IFRD1 display decreased protein and mRNA levels of MyoD, and myogenin, and after muscle crash damage in young mice there was a delay in regeneration.

Recently it has been shown that upregulation of IFRD1 in vivo in injured muscle potentiates muscle regeneration by increasing the production of staminal muscle cells (satellite cells). The underlying molecular mechanism lies in the ability of IFRD1 to cooperate with MyoD at inducing the transcriptional activity of MEF2C. This relies on the ability of IFRD1 to bind selectively MEF2C, thus inhibiting its interaction with HDAC4. Therefore, IFRD1 appears to act as a positive cofactor of MyoD. More recently it has been shown that IFRD1 potentiates muscle regeneration by a second mechanism that potentiates MyoD, i.e., by repressing the transcriptional activity of NF-κB, which is known to inhibit MyoD mRNA accumulation. IFRD1 represses the activity of NF-κB p65 by enhancing the HDAC-mediated deacetylation of the p65 subunit,  by favoring the recruitment of HDAC3 to p65. In fact IFRD1 forms trimolecular complexes with p65 and HDAC3.

Thus, IFRD1 can induce muscle regeneration acting as a pivotal regulator of the MyoD pathway through multiple mechanisms.
Given the dramatic decrease of myogenic cells occurring in muscle degenerative pathologies such as Duchenne dystrophy, the ability of IFRD1 to potentiate the regenerative process suggests that IFRD1 might be a therapeutic target.

Interactions 

IFRD1 has been shown to interact with several proteins in the SIN3 complex including SIN3B, SAP30, NCOR1, and HDAC1. Moreover, IFRD1 protein binds MyoD, MEF2C, HDAC4, HDAC3 and the p65 subunit of NF-κB, forming trimolecular complexes with HDAC3 and p65 NF-κB proteins. IFRD1 protein also forms homodimers.

References

Further reading